"Which Bridge to Cross (Which Bridge to Burn)" is a song co-written and recorded by American country music artist Vince Gill.  It was released in January 1995 as the fourth single from the album When Love Finds You.  The song reached number 4 on the Billboard Hot Country Singles & Tracks chart.  It was written by Gill and Bill Anderson.

Critical reception
Deborah Evans Price, of Billboard magazine reviewed the song favorably calling it a "classic slow country waltz." She goes on to say that the song "makes optimum use of those classic changes and raises the chill bumps at every turn."

Personnel
Compiled from the liner notes.
Stuart Duncan – fiddle
Vince Gill – lead and backing vocals
John Hughey – steel guitar
Matt Rollings – piano
Randy Scruggs – acoustic guitar
Dawn Sears – backing vocals
Milton Sledge – drums
Billy Thomas – backing vocals
Billy Joe Walker Jr. – electric guitar
Pete Wasner – synthesizer 
Willie Weeks – bass guitar
Jeff White – backing vocals

Chart performance
"Which Bridge to Cross (Which Bridge to Burn) debuted at number 61 on the U.S. Billboard Hot Country Singles & Tracks for the week of February 4, 1995.

Year-end charts

References

1995 singles
Vince Gill songs
Songs written by Vince Gill
Songs written by Bill Anderson (singer)
Song recordings produced by Tony Brown (record producer)
MCA Records singles
1995 songs